Gabriel Paul Winkler (born July 22, 1976) is an American lightweight rower. He won a gold medal at the 2000 World Rowing Championships in Zagreb with the lightweight men's eight. Gabe Winkler attended Saint Johnsbury Academy in Saint Johnsbury Vermont.

References

1976 births
Living people
American male rowers
World Rowing Championships medalists for the United States
Pan American Games medalists in rowing
Pan American Games gold medalists for the United States
Pan American Games silver medalists for the United States
Rowers at the 2007 Pan American Games
Medalists at the 2007 Pan American Games